James J. Gaffney (June 18, 1863 – November 30, 1946), most often known as J. J. Gaffney, was an American architect in Louisville, Kentucky.

A number of his works are listed on the National Register of Historic Places.

Personal life
Gaffney is buried at St. Louis Cemetery in Louisville.

Works
Adath Jeshurun Temple and School, 749-757 S. Brook St., Louisville, Kentucky, NRHP-listed
Bosler Fireproof Garage (later called the Morrissey Garage), 423 S. 3rd St., Louisville, Kentucky, NRHP-listed
Gaffney House (1910-1927), River Road between Longview Lane and Boxhill Lane, Louisville, Kentucky, NRHP-listed
Highlands Historic District, Louisville, Kentucky.  Gaffney is credited with several homes in the district, including those located at 703 Rubel Avenue (built 1899), 1411 Highland Avenue (built 1898), 2017-19 Murray Avenue (built 1907), and probable attribution to the homes at 1222 and 1224 East Broadway (built 1901).
Marmaduke Building, 520 S. Fourth Ave., Louisville, Kentucky, NRHP-listed
Repton, 314 Ridgedale Rd., Louisville, Kentucky, NRHP-listed
St. James Roman Catholic Church, Rectory, and School, 1430 Bardstown Rd., 1826 and 1818 Edenside Ave., Louisville, Kentucky, NRHP-listed
Taggart House, 5000 Bardstown Rd., Buechel, Kentucky, NRHP-listed
Thierman Apartments, 416-420 W. Breckinridge St., Louisville, Kentucky, NRHP-listed
Waverly Hills Tuberculosis Sanitarium, later known as Waverly Hills Geriatrics Center, 8101 Dixie Hwy., Louisville, Kentucky, NRHP-listed

References

1863 births
1946 deaths
Architects from Louisville, Kentucky
Burials at St. Louis Cemetery, Louisville